The Alkham Valley is in the Kent Downs (the eastern part of the North Downs), an Area of Outstanding Natural Beauty, in South East Kent, England. The valley lies between Folkestone and Dover.

The Valley is a dry valley, typical of many others on the chalk downs.

References

External links
Reference to the walks/rides available in the Valley
 

Dover District